Today Is Yesterday is a 2002 compilation album by English folk/rock singer-songwriter Roy Harper. Amongst its 17 tracks are six unreleased and eight rare songs. All the tracks were recorded between 1964 and 1969.

History 
Tracks 1–9 date from 1964 to 1965 and were recorded on an old mono Ferrograph quarter-inch Reel-to-reel audio tape deck. These tracks formed a demo tape that landed Harper his first record contract. Track 10 is a re-recording of a part of that demo tape and became the B-side of Harper's first single.

Tracks 11 and 13 became Harper's second single, while track 12 was a single contender which didn't make the cut. Track 14 is the latest recording on this album. Tracks 15 and 16 were both recorded in 1967. Track 15 became the A-side of Harper's third single, however track 16 was rejected. Track 17 goes back to 1965–1966 and is the A-side of Harper's first single.

Track listing
All tracks credited to Roy Harper
"Long Hot Summer's Day" – 3:47
"The Scaffold Of The Daylight" – 2:40
"Black Clouds" – 4:48
"Girlie" – 3:31
"In The Morning" – 2:25
"Love" – 3:06
"Forever" – 2:53
"Little Old Lady" – 4:50
"Mountain" – 3:40
"Pretty Baby" – 2:31
"Midspring Dithering" – 2:43
"(It's Tomorrow And) Today Is Yesterday" – 4:06
"Zengem" – 1:34
"Zaney Janey" – 3:28
"Life Goes By" – 3:16
"Night Fighter (Ballad Of A Songwriter)" – 3:05
"Take Me Into Your Eyes" – 2:27

Personnel 

Roy Harper

References

External links 
Roy Harper Official Site
Excellent Roy Harper resource

Roy Harper (singer) compilation albums
2002 compilation albums